Josh McNulty (born 24 March 1994) is an English rugby union player who plays for Harlequins in the Gallagher Premiership.

He was part of Worcester Warriors academy, featuring for Worcester Cavaliers in the Aviva A League during the 2013-14 campaign. He switch to Gloucester Rugby academy from the 2015-16 season where he made his senior debut for the Cherry and Whites against Worcester Warriors in the European Challenge Cup in December 2015.

On 21 April 2017, McNulty would leave Gloucester to sign for Premiership rivals Harlequins from the 2017-18 season.
Since signing for Quins, McNulty has often been overlooked at the first team level. But recently featured in the Quins Anglo-Welsh Cup victory against the Scarlets on the 28th of January 2018 (35-7).

References

External links
Harlequins Profile

1994 births
Living people
English rugby union players
Rugby union props
Gloucester Rugby players
Worcester Warriors players
Harlequin F.C. players
Rugby union players from Coventry